Alastair Lorne Campbell of Airds (1937-2022) is a former Scottish officer of arms and author. Campbell of Airds was appointed Unicorn Pursuivant of Arms in Ordinary in 1987. In 2008 he was appointed Islay Herald Extraordinary. As an active member of the Highland Society of London, Airds published a short history of the Society in 1978. He has also written several books on the history of Clan Campbell.

He is the son of Lorne MacLaine Campbell of Airds.

References

Living people
Scottish officers of arms
1937 births